Henry Jones (? – ?), nicknamed Baldy Jones,  was a Major League Baseball pitcher who played in   with the Pittsburgh Alleghenys of the National League.

External links

Major League Baseball pitchers
19th-century baseball players
Baseball players from Pennsylvania
Pittsburgh Alleghenys players
Duluth Jayhawks players
Wilkes-Barre Coal Barons players
Year of death missing
Year of birth missing